For lists of 2022 albums, see:

 List of 2022 albums (January–June)
 List of 2022 albums (July–December)